Isolepis is a cosmopolitan genus of sedge containing around 70 species. Isolepis is found in cool tropical and temperate climates often in Africa and Australasia.

Isolepis was first described by prolific botanist Robert Brown in 1810. In 1870 a botanist Boeckeler disbanded the genus putting most of the names under a different genus, Scirpus. By the early 20th century Isolepis ceased to exist with other botanists following on from Boeckler's work. It was not until the late 20th century that Isolepis was reinstated as a distinct genus due to embryological research.

See also
List of Isolepis species

References

 
Cyperaceae genera
Taxa named by Carl Linnaeus